The 1981–82 season saw Rochdale compete in their 8th consecutive season in the Football League Fourth Division.

Statistics
																								

|}

Final League Table

Competitions

Football League Fourth Division

F.A. Cup

League Cup

Rose Bowl

References

Rochdale A.F.C. seasons
Rochdale